The Telephone Girl and the Lady is a 1913 American silent drama film directed by D. W. Griffith.

Plot
A telephone operator is walking out with a handsome police sergeant; her father insists that the husband for her is a plump, comfortable grocery store owner. The Lady picks up her jewels from the jewellery and brings them home, followed by a jewel thief on a stolen bicycle. She puts them in her safe, and goes to give the telephone girl a present of a necklace in thanks for her work. As the Lady answers the telephone and accepts the Telephone Girl's effusive thanks, the door creaks open – it is the masked thief! She tells the girl on the other end of the line that she's being robbed. While the thief grills the lady, the telephone girl calls the police, but there's a riot and calls about that prevent her getting through. She runs out of the exchange and spots the sergeant conveniently riding by. He lifts her onto his horse and they gallop to the rescue. Meanwhile, with an implicit rape threat the thief has forced the lady to reveal the safe concealed behind a picture. Just in time, the sergeant bursts in as the thief escapes with the jewels. After a rousing fight, helped by the feisty telephone girl and neighbours including a lady in a huge hat, the sergeant drags away the thief. The lady rewards the sergeant and the lovers fall into each other's arms.

Cast
 Mae Marsh as The Telephone Girl
 Claire McDowell as The Lady
 Alfred Paget as The Telephone Girl's Sweetheart
 Walter P. Lewis as The Father
 Harry Carey as The Thief
 John T. Dillon as The Grocery Man
 Madge Kirby as The Telephone Operator
 Joseph McDermott as The Jewelry Salesman
 Kate Bruce as The Lady's Friend
 Gertrude Bambrick as The Maid
 Lionel Barrymore as The Desk Sergeant
 Charles Hill Mailes

Production
The film was prepared by Griffith and shot by his assistant, Tony O'Sullivan.

Film historian William K. Everson noted that the film made use of a moving camera in "some extremely good running inserts" and a "well-done fight between Paget and villain Harry Carey at the climax", but offered that the film did not have a good flow due to its awkward cuts and overuse of devices intended to prolong suspense.

See also
 Harry Carey filmography
 D. W. Griffith filmography
 Lionel Barrymore filmography

References

External links

The Telephone Girl and the Lady available for free download at Internet Archive

1913 films
1913 drama films
1913 short films
Films directed by D. W. Griffith
Silent American drama films
American silent short films
American black-and-white films
Biograph Company films
Films with screenplays by Anita Loos
1910s American films